Annovka is a rural locality (a village) in Nizhnekaryshevsky Selsoviet, Baltachevsky District, Bashkortostan, Russia. The population was 71 as of 2010. There are 3 streets.

Geography 
Annovka is located 23 km south of Starobaltachevo (the district's administrative centre) by road. Nizhnekaryshevo is the nearest rural locality.

References 

Rural localities in Baltachevsky District